The 2007 Swedish Golf Tour, known as the Telia Tour for sponsorship reasons, was the 22nd season of the Swedish Golf Tour, a series of professional golf tournaments for women held in Sweden and Finland.

Amateur Caroline Hedwall won four events, and Norway's Marianne Skarpnord won the Order of Merit. Through her win, Skarpnord, along with Order of Merit runner-up Florence Lüscher from Switzerland, secured cards for the 2008 Ladies European Tour.

The tour enjoyed an international field and, in all, players of six different nationalities won titles, and a further four nationalities were runner-ups.

Schedule
The season consisted of 12 tournaments played between May and October, where one event was held in Finland.

Order of Merit
An official feeder tour for the Ladies European Tour, the top two finishers in the Order of Merit earned LET cards for 2008.

See also
2007 Swedish Golf Tour (men's tour)

References

External links
Official homepage of the Swedish Golf Tour

Swedish Golf Tour (women)
Swedish Golf Tour (women)